BCH Lions is a Mongolian professional association football club that competes in the Mongolian Premier League. The current manager is Badarch Chin-Orgil.

History
BCH Lions was founded in 2018 as it broke away from Premier League club Selenge Press FC under the guidance of former Selenge Press coach Badarch Chin-Orgil. The following year, the team won the National Amateur Cup.

As a result of its Amateur Cup title, the team competed in the inaugural season of the Mongolia 2nd League later in 2019. The season ended with the club earning the championship and promotion to the Mongolia 1st League in 2020. At the end of the season, BCH Lions players were named the league's best defender (Sasaki Mizuho), goalkeeper (Nakane Hiroki), and midfielder (B. Itgel). 

During its first season in the second division, the club earned a third-straight championship and promotion. Lions striker Batkhüyag Munkh-Erdene won the Golden Boot that season  with 32 goals and his bicycle kick goal against Khoromkhon earned international attention from Portugal's Desporto ao Minuto. 

The club will competed in the Mongolian Premier League for the first time in 2021. They avoided relegation in their first season, finishing in 8th position. First-year BCH striker Tetsuaki Misawa won the league Golden Boot award as top goal scorer that season with seventeen goals and five assists in sixteen appearances.

Domestic history
Key

References

External links
Mongolian Football Federation profile 
Official Facebook profile
MyCujoo channel

Football clubs in Mongolia
Sport in Ulaanbaatar
Organizations based in Ulaanbaatar
2018 establishments in Mongolia
Association football clubs established in 2018